High on Fire is an American heavy metal band from Oakland, California, that was formed in 1998. Matt Pike, the band's frontman and founder, also plays guitar for doom metal band Sleep. High on Fire won the 2019 Grammy Award for Best Metal Performance with their song "Electric Messiah".

History
High on Fire was founded in late summer 1998 by Sleep guitarist Matt Pike, drummer Des Kensel, and bassist George Rice (from Dear Deceased, who originally auditioned to be the band's vocalist). The band's first full-length album The Art of Self Defense was released on 12th Records, and released later on Man's Ruin Records. (The album would later be re-released by Tee Pee Records, with two bonus tracks, as Man's Ruin Records had become defunct.)

In 2001, High on Fire signed a record deal with Relapse Records and recorded the album Surrounded by Thieves. The album was released on May 28, 2002. After the tours promoting Surrounded by Thieves, bassist George Rice left the band and was replaced by ex-Melvins/Thrones bassist Joe Preston.

The band's next album, 2005's Blessed Black Wings, was largely written by Pike and Kensel before the recording of the album took place. The album was produced by Steve Albini, and was released on February 1, 2005. A music video was produced for the song "Devilution." While touring with Goatwhore and Watch Them Die to promote Blessed Black Wings, Joe Preston left the band for undisclosed reasons, and was temporarily replaced by Zeke bassist Jeff Matz. Matz finished the tour with High on Fire and became a full-time member during the recording of Death Is This Communion. Death Is This Communion was released on September 18, 2007 (September 10, in Europe).

After Death is This Communion was released, High on Fire played a small string of Northwest shows to promote it. The band did a headline tour of North America in September and October 2007, with support from the Japanese post-rock band Mono, along with Panthers and Coliseum. High on Fire also played on 2008's Gigantour, which was followed by a North American tour with the bands Opeth, Baroness, and Nachtmystium.

On December 17, 2008, High on Fire signed a recording deal with Koch Records. On August 1, 2009, it was announced that a new album would be recorded with producer Greg Fidelman. Later that month, following the news of the new album, High on Fire announced a tour with Mastodon, Dethklok, and Converge. The tour spanned from October 2 to November 21.

In August 2009, the band went into post-production of the follow-up to Death Is This Communion at The Pass Studios in Los Angeles. The album artwork for the new album was released on January 7, 2010. On January 15, following the release of the album artwork, the song Frost Hammer was posted on the band's Myspace page, and a video for the song was released on March 16, 2010. High on Fire's fifth album Snakes for the Divine was formally released on February 23, 2010.

In March 2010, the band announced a headlining U.S. tour to promote the album; supporting bands for the tour include Priestess, Black Cobra, and Bison B.C. On April 6, 2010, the band announced they would be opening for Metallica for eight European shows.

In 2010, the band was confirmed as being part of the soundtrack for Namco Bandai Games' 2010 remake of Splatterhouse.
On April 3, 2012, High on Fire released their sixth studio album, De Vermis Mysteriis. Metalsucks.net reviews editor Sammy O'Hagar argued that the band has "rebounded in epic fashion" since their last album, and that "Even for a band as esteemed as High on Fire, [De Vermis Mysteriis] is a career high point."

High on Fire was scheduled to play the 2012 Mayhem Festival but dropped off the tour due to Matt Pike's health. Pike returned to the band and they once again began touring in November 2012.

High on Fire's album Luminiferous became available in full for free streaming as a preview with NPR music on June 7, 2015, with the official release of the album nine days later on June 16. Luminiferous is the second High on Fire album in a row produced by Converge guitarist Kurt Ballou. NPR reviewer Adrien Begrand credits Kurt Ballou with "helping rejuvenate the band's sound" on their previous album, and praises the album as evidence of High on Fire's consistency, fueled by the "right combination of adherence to formula and subtle experimentation." Dan Epstein, writing for Rolling Stone, concurs that "one could definitely make the case that [Luminiferous] is High on Fire's finest album yet."

At the 61st Grammy Awards held on February 10, 2019, High on Fire won their first Grammy for "Best Metal Performance" for their song "Electric Messiah".

Drummer and co-founder Des Kensel announced his departure from the band on July 26, 2019. He was replaced with Big Business and ex-Melvins drummer Coady Willis in June 2021.

Personnel

Current
 Matt Pike – guitars, vocals (1998–present)
 Jeff Matz – bass (2005–present)
 Coady Willis – drums (2021–present)

Former
 Des Kensel – drums (1998–2019)
 George Rice – bass (1998–2002)
 Joe Preston – bass (2002–2005)

Touring members
 Chris Maggio – drums (2019–2021)

Timeline

Discography
Studio albums

Live albums

Singles, EPs and splits

Singles

Music videos

References

External links

Musical groups established in 1998
Grammy Award winners
Heavy metal musical groups from California
Relapse Records artists
American stoner rock musical groups
American doom metal musical groups
American musical trios
Musical groups from Oakland, California